Highway 310 (AR 310, Ark. 310, and Hwy. 310) is a designation for two state highways in Central Arkansas. One route of  begins at Highway 36 and runs east to Highway 16. A second route of  begins at Highway 5 and runs west to Faulkner County Route 310 (CR 310) Clinton Mountain Road west of Enola. All routes are maintained by the Arkansas Department of Transportation (ArDOT).

History

Highway 310 was created between Highway 36 and Sidon by the Arkansas State Highway Commission (ASHC) on November 23, 1966. The section between Highway 5 and the Faulkner County line was added to the state highway system by the ASHC on March 3, 1988.

In 1992, following the consolidation of the Enola and Mount Vernon school districts, the ASHC authorized AHTD to study if adding a road between the two communities would be feasible. The study resulted in adding the former White CR 67 between Enola and Mount Vernon to the state highway system as Highway 310. The resolution also authorized the decommissioning of a short segment of Highway 310 at Guy and Highway 287 near Greenbrier.

Major intersections

Former route

See also

Notes

References

External links

310
Transportation in Cleburne County, Arkansas
Transportation in Faulkner County, Arkansas
Transportation in White County, Arkansas